Oil God is a 2006 newsgame created by Persuasive Games dealing with the relationship between the gas prices at the pump and the way the oil industry works. It has been likened to a simpler version of the strategy game Black & White. The lead designer was Ian Bogost. The reception was mediocre; James Ransom-Wiley of Engadget called it "a crude experience, pumped with superficial cynicism [that] fails to deliver "news" about the real world oil biz."

References

2006 video games
Browser games
Business simulation games
Educational video games
Political video games
Satirical video games
Strategy video games
Video games developed in the United States